The Sibovc Coal Mine is a coal mine in Kosovo. The mine is located in Obiliq in District of Pristina. The mine has coal reserves amounting to 1 billion tonnes of lignite, one of the largest lignite reserves in Europe.

See also 
 Coal in Kosovo
 Natural resources of Kosovo

References

External links
 Kosovo Energy Corporation (Official website)
Report

Coal mines in Kosovo